Sonmati is a village in Babubarhi block in Madhubani district of Bihar state, India.

As per data of census 2001, it has a total population of 2903 out of which 1496 are males & 1407 are females.

This village is connected by pucca road and nearest railway station is Khutauna.

Maithili is mother tongue of all the inhabitants  of the village.

Agriculture is the main occupation of the people of this village.

However, many people of this village are in Govt, public and private sector holding important positions outside their native state of Bihar.

Population consists of Hindu and Muslim religion and almost all castes live in harmony

It has a middle school and a non-operable primary health centre also.

People of this village and neighboring villages celebrate Janmashtami every year and a village mela is also organized on this auspicious occasion.This Janmashtmi Mela is one of the biggest Mela In District.

It is a matter of concern that primary health centre once approved in this village is no longer functional now. Recently a Panchayat bhavan has also been built in this village .
Villages in Madhubani district